"Get Out And Get Under The Moon" is a popular song.

The music was written by Larry Shay, the lyrics by Charles Tobias and William Jerome. The song was published in 1928.

Popular recordings of the song in 1928 were by Helen Kane, by Van and Schenck and by Paul Whiteman (with a vocal group including Bing Crosby).  The song is now a standard, and has been recorded by many artists over the years, including Doris Day (for her album Cuttin' Capers (1959)), Nat King Cole (for his album Those Lazy-Hazy-Crazy Days of Summer (1963)) and Michael Feinstein.

"Get Out and Get Under the Moon" was used in commercials for the American Apollo Program in 1968.

References

1928 songs
Songs with music by Larry Shay
Songs with lyrics by William Jerome
Songs written by Charles Tobias
Van and Schenck songs